Johann Jakob von Bronckhorst (Burg Anholt, 12 February 1582 - Freiburg im Breisgau, 19 October 1630), named Graf Anholt, was Count of Bronckhorst-Batenburg and Imperial fieldmarshal during the Thirty Years' War.

Life
He was the second son of Jacob of Bronckhorst-Batenburg (1553–1582) and Gertrud of Myllendonk (1552–1612). He studied in Lorraine and did a Grand Tour of Italy. In 1603, like his father, he entered the Spanish army. After the Twelve Years' Truce in 1609, he became a colonel in the Austrian army. His commander Leopold V, Archduke of Austria, appointed him in his Geheimrat and made him commander of a Regiment. He fought in the Thirty Years' War in 1618, and also participated in the Battle of White Mountain in 1620. As a reward, he became count in 1621 and Field Marshal the following year.

In 1622/23 he fought in Westfalen against Christian von Braunschweig-Wolfenbüttel and Peter Ernst von Mansfeld, which he pushed back into East Frisia. He played an important role in the victory in the Battle of Stadtlohn, as commander of the vanguard.

In 1624 he participated in the Siege of Breda under Ambrosio Spinola, and fought later under Tilly in Osnabrück against the Danes. In the Winter of 1627/28 he took up winter quarters in East Frisia. In 1628 he became a Knight in the Order of the Golden Fleece, and in 1629 he became Governor of the Alsace and of Further Austria. In 1630 he died in Freiburg from tuberculosis.

Family
Johann Jakob married on 6 November 1618 with Maria Cleopha von Hohenzollern-Sigmaringen, daughter of Charles II, Count of Hohenzollern-Sigmaringen and Elisabeth von Pallandt-Culemborg. They had 2 children:

 Johanna Katharina Isabelle (1627-1685), married in 1641 with Jacques Philip of Croÿ-Millendonck (died 1683), Their son was Fieldmarshal Charles Eugène de Croÿ.
 Dietrich

External links
  Biography  (pdf; 103 kB)

Military personnel of the Thirty Years' War
German people of the Thirty Years' War
Knights of the Golden Fleece
1582 births
1630 deaths
Field marshals of the Holy Roman Empire
Military personnel from Saxony-Anhalt